Aminata Dembélé Bagayoko is a Malian feminist. She is President of the Association pour la Formation Féminine et Appuis Communautaires (AFFAC) In 1996 she founded the school Promo-femme: Center of Audiovisual Education for Young Women, which has "changed the gender demographic of photographers working in Bamako".

Bagayako established Proto-femme as a private venture, helped by funding from the Canadian government.

References

External links
 Mme Bagayoko Minata Dembélé, promotrice du centre

Year of birth missing (living people)
Living people
Malian feminists
Art educators
Photography in Mali
21st-century Malian people